Taras Oleksandrovych Hrebenyuk (born 23 August 1971) is a Ukrainian retired professional footballer who played as a goalkeeper and current goalkeeping coach at Kryvbas Kryvyi Rih.

Honours
Metalist Kharkiv
 Ukrainian First League runner-up: 2003–04

References

External links
 
 

1971 births
Living people
Footballers from Zaporizhzhia
Soviet footballers
Ukrainian footballers
Association football goalkeepers
FC Nyva Vinnytsia players
FC Chayka Sevastopol players
FC Ahrotekhservis Sumy players
FC Viktor Zaporizhzhia players
FC Metalurh Zaporizhzhia players
FC Metalurh-2 Zaporizhzhia players
FC Arsenal Kyiv players
FC Spartak Sumy players
FC Metalist Kharkiv players
FC Metalist-2 Kharkiv players
Ukrainian Premier League players
Ukrainian First League players
Ukrainian Second League players
Ukrainian football managers
FC Lviv managers
Ukrainian Premier League managers
Ukrainian expatriate football managers
Expatriate football managers in Russia
Ukrainian expatriate sportspeople in Russia
Expatriate football managers in Belarus
Ukrainian expatriate sportspeople in Belarus
Expatriate football managers in Moldova
Ukrainian expatriate sportspeople in Moldova